Bechyně (or Bechingen) is a town in Tábor District in the South Bohemian Region of the Czech Republic. It has about 4,900 inhabitants. The historic town centre is well preserved and is protected by law as an urban monument zone.

Administrative parts
Villages of Hvožďany and Senožaty are administrative parts of Bechyně.

Geography
It lies in the Tábor Uplands. The town lies on a promontory above the confluence of the Lužnice River and Smutná brook. Another brook called Židova strouha also flows into the river in the municipal territory.

History

The area of today's town was settled already in prehistorical era. The oldest evidence of settlement in this area comes from late Bronze Age (c. 1800–1600 BC). In the 8th or 9th century, a Slavic gord was built here.

The first written mention of Bechyně is from around 1120 from Chronica Boemorum, when there was written about settlement of the Bechyně gord in 993. In 1268, Bechyně was boughts by King Ottokar II of Bohemia, who decided to have a stone castle built here. In 1323, King John of Bohemia promoted the market village around the castle to a town, redefined its borders and have the fortification built.

In 1422 and then again in 1428, the town was conquered and burned down by the Hussites. From 1340 to 1569, the town was alternately owned by various aristocratic families, including Sternbergs and Schwambergs. In 1569, Bechyně was acquired by Peter Vok of Rosenberg, under whose rule the town experienced a renaissance boom and the reconstruction of the castle. In 1596, Peter Vok sold Bechyně to Adam of Sternberg.

Bechyně was damaged and looted during the Thirty Years' War. The town recovered and grew up to the north. In the 18th century, it developed to a spa town.

Demographics

Economy

The economy is oriented to services. There are no major industrial employers.

Ceramic tradition
Ceramic tradition in Bechyně began in 15th century by small pottery shops. This ceramic tradition has evolved from pottery to a big sanitary ceramic factory of Schweizer Keramik Holding AG Laufen company.

Spa
Bechyně Spa is one of the oldest spas in the country. The first mention of the healing spring is from 1576, and in 1647, the first spa house was built. In 1727, healing effects were proven by water analysis, and in 1939, healing effects of local peat were also discovered.

Today the spa is specialized in body treatment using therapeutic mud. It treats arthritis and osteoarthritis, ankylosing spondylitis, metabolic diseases affecting the joints, pre-operative and postoperative conditions, neurological disorders and many other diseases.

Transport

The town is the terminus of the Tábor–Bechyně railway line. This railway was built in 1903 and was the first electrified railway in the Austria-Hungary. The original passenger train is preserved and operates several times each summer.

On the eastern part of Bechyně is a unique rail and road arch bridge, the Bechyně Bridge.

Education
There is the oldest vocational school of ceramics in Bohemia, which is still functioning. Among its famous student were people like Karel Roden, Karel Kryl or Jan Kačer.

Culture
Bechyně has a rich theatre tradition since 1855. Since 1990s there are five theatre festivals every year.

Sights

Bechyně Castle is the main landmark of the town. The castle was built in the 13th century, although almost none of that original structure remains today. In 1581, Peter Vok of Rosenberg let the late gothic castle rebuilt into a comfortable Renaissance residence with a rich fresco decoration.

Bechyně Monastery was founded in the 15th century and built in the late Gothic style, after the previous monastery was burned down by Hussites in 1422. It is still the property of the Franciscan Order. The monastery complex include the Church of the Assumption of the Virgin Mary and a monastery garden open to the public.

The Church of Saint Matthew is the landmark of the town square. It was built in the 13th century and rebuilt several times, most notably in the early 17th century. It has preserved interiors from 16th–18th centuries.

The Church of Saint Michael is an early Baroque cemetery church from 1670. Today it serves cultural purposes.

The Firefighter Museum is the oldest museum of its kind in Bohemia. It presents exponates up to 400 years old. The International Museum of Ceramics is located in the former brewery and in the adjacent castle bastions. It follows the history of the industry in Bechyně and includes exhibitions of artists from around the world. The Tourism Museum is located in the former synagogue and reflect tradition of tourism in the Czech Republic and activities of Czech Tourist Club. In the castle complex there is the Vladimír Preclík Museum with works of this sculptor. In the town centre, there is the Town Museum Bechyně, which presents history of the town.

Bechyn, Minnesota
In the United States state of Minnesota is a little town called Bechyn, probably established by people from Bechyně who emigrated to the US to work there. They still say they have Czech origin and celebrate it every year by organizing "Czech Heritage Festival", where they keep old traditions.

Notable people
Václav Pichl (1741–1805), classical composer
Ladislav Haškovec (1866–1944), neuropsychiatrist
Josefina Napravilová (1914–2014), humanitarian worker; lived in Bechyně at the end of her life
Miroslav Kalousek (born 1960), politician, former Finance Minister; lives here

Twin towns – sister cities

Bechyně is twinned with:
 Heřmanův Městec, Czech Republic

References

External links

 
Official website 

Cities and towns in the Czech Republic
Populated places in Tábor District
Spa towns in the Czech Republic